Pua Kumbu is a traditional patterned multicolored ceremonial cotton cloth used by the Iban people in Sarawak, Malaysia.

Legends on the origins of Iban weaving
There are many legends about the origin of Pua Kumbu rare, all revolving around the characters of Menggin and Dara Tinchin. The story starts with Menggin, an Iban hunter who shot a beautiful bird with his blowpipe. As he ran to retrieve his game, what he found was a woven skirt instead of a bird. He kept the woven skirt as he had never seen one before. However, he did not know that it belonged to Dara Tinchin Temaga, eldest daughter of a petara known as Singalang Burong. She was looking for her kain everywhere. When she met Menggin, he returned the skirt. In return, Dara married Menggin, although she was already married. She brought him to her home, the other world, the land of the Gods. They also had a son, Sera Gunting. After a year, Dara’s first husband returned home. She asked Menggin and Sera to return to the Iban world and for their journey to wear a jacket known as baju burong and her kain that she had woven. From that day onwards, the jacket and kain have been passed down to many Iban women so they can weave the same designs and remain close to the Gods. And that is how the weaving of pua kumbu began.

Dyeing and weaving process
The process starts with preparing the yarn for the weaving, which consists of the following:
 Nabu’ - winding the thread into balls
 Muai - to sort out
 Ngirit - the process of stretching and pulling a skin of thread horizontally, one thead at a time, to form the base or warp
 Ngarap - the selection of alternate warp
 Ngebat - tying
 Mampul - to cover
 Muka’ tanchang - untying
 Ngerembai - unfolding
 Anak and Ara – adding side designs

Weaving
In order to prepare for the weaving process, the yarns are unfolded and carefully arranged on a wooden frame. Before the actual weaving begins, the side sections of the unfolded yarn known as anak or ara are carefully arranged. Nenun or weaving is done using a backstrap loom placed in a convenient spot within the longhouse. The final stage involves finishing of the top and bottom edges with a crowfeet pattern.

Dyeing 
All of the raw materials for the natural dyes are harvested from the rainforest. The Iban have traditionally made use of a large number of plants to produce a range of rich beautiful dyes. The rengat plant produces an ‘indigo’ colour in many different tones. The akar penawar landak is used to obtain yellow color dye. For the Engkudu dye, if kapok or quicklime is added the colour will turn brown. The yarn is dipped into the combination, turned until it is well saturated and left to soak before it is dried under the sun. After the dye process yarns are further prepared by tying sections to build up the design.

In the media
Filem Negara Malaysia produced a 16-minute documentary about Pua Kumbu in 1993 and has been aired on Radio Televisyen Malaysia (RTM) and TV Pendidikan.

Further reading
 Traude Gavin, Iban Ritual Textiles. KITLV Press. 2003. xi, pp. 356 . 
 “Pua Kumbu,” The Asian Civilisations Museum A-Z Guide to its Collections. p. 258.  Asian Civilisations Museum. 2003. National Heritage Board, Singapore.

References

External links

  Pua Kumbu - Malaysia National Library.
  – a documentary about the traditional patterned cloth produced by Filem Negara Malaysia

Malaysian culture
Textile arts
Woven fabrics